Novembre (Italian, 'November') is an Italian doom metal band, formed in Rome in 1990.

Biography
Starting out in 1990 as a death metal band (then called Catacomb), Novembre grew to develop a unique, atmospheric sound. Although most of their lyrics are in English, vocalist Carmelo Orlando sings in Italian occasionally in many of their songs. They released their first two albums, Wish I Could Dream It Again and Arte Novecento, through Italian label Polyphemus. In the mid-1990s, they signed with Century Media to release their next three albums, Classica, Novembrine Waltz, and Dreams d'Azur. More recently, Novembre signed to Peaceville Records, to release their sixth album Materia, which took on a progressive rock influence, and their seventh album, The Blue, which saw a return to addition of death metal-esque passages. After eight years of absence, Novembre completed work on a new studio album, which was released on Peaceville Records on April 1, 2016 called Ursa. Simultaneously, it was also announced that the band’s longtime drummer and co-founder Giuseppe Orlando left the band, leaving Carmelo Orlando as the only original member.

Band members
Current members
Carmelo Orlando – guitar, vocals, keyboards 
Massimiliano Pagliuso – guitar 
Fabio Fraschini – bass guitar 
David Folchitto – drums 

Past members
Fabio Vignati – bass guitar 
Antonio Poletti – guitars 
Alessandro Niola – bass guitar 
Demian Cristiani – bass guitar 
Luca Giovagnoli – bass guitar 
Valerio Di Lella – bass guitar 
Giuseppe Orlando – drums 
Thomas Negrini – keyboards 

Timeline

Discography
Wish I Could Dream it Again (Polyphemus, 1994)
Arte Novecento (Polyphemus, 1996)
Classica (Century Media, 2000)
Novembrine Waltz (Century Media, 2001)
Dreams d'Azur (Century Media, 2002)
Materia (Peaceville, 2006)
Memoria Stoica (CD single) (Peaceville, 2006)
The Blue (Peaceville, 2007)
URSA (Peaceville, 2016)

References

Italian progressive metal musical groups
Italian gothic metal musical groups
Musical groups established in 1990
Musical quartets